James Percy Ault (October 29, 1881, Olathe, Kansas – November 29, 1929, Apia, Samoa) was an American geodetic surveyor, geophysicist, geomagnetic researcher, and captain of the research vessel Carnegie. As captain of the Carnegie, he discovered submarine mountain ranges off the western coast of South America and provided empirical confirmation of the Chandler wobble.

Biography
Ault graduated in 1904 with an A.B. from Baker University. As an undergraduate at Baker University, he served from January 1901 to June 1904 as an observatory assistant in the United States Coast and Geodetic Survey's magnetic observatory in Baldwin, Kansas. William Charles Bauer, a physics and chemistry professor at Baker University, was impressed by Ault's abilities and gave him a recommendation to Louis Agricola Bauer, director of the Carnegie Institution's Department of Terrestrial Magnetism and William Charles Bauer's brother. Immediately after completing his undergraduate degree in June 1904, Ault joined the Carnegie Institution of Washington (CIW) as a magnetic observer in the Department of Terrestrial Magnetism. He remained a CIW employee for the rest of his life. In 1905, after preliminary training aboard the Bache on a cruise from Baltimore to Panama, he joined the crew of the research vessel Galilee to do geomagnetic research in the world's oceans. In November 1906 at the conclusion of the cruise of the Galilee, he was assigned to make magnetic observations in northern Mexico until March 1907. On March 27, 1907 in Washington, Kansas, he married Mamie A. Totten. Soon after their marriage, the Aults moved to Washington, D.C. In 1908 he made geomagnetic observations in the Canadian interior during a three-month canoe trip, covering 1,600 miles.

In 1909 he graduated with an A.M. from Columbia University. After graduation, he joined in 1909 the crew of the research vessel Carnegie, constructed of wood and non-ferrous metals to accommodate magnetic research. Aboard the Carnegie he was a magnetic observer during Cruise I from 1909 to 1910. During 1911 he did office work at CIW headquarters. In 1912 he was in charge of field parties in Bolivia, Peru, and Chile for the purpose of training magnetic observers under expeditionary field conditions. In 1912 the Aults' first daughter Evelyn was born. He was appointed in 1914 to the Carnegie'''s captaincy for Cruise III and in later years the captaincy for Cruises IV, VI, and VII. Carnegies Cruise IV included a circumnavigation of Antartica in 1915–1916. The Aults' second daughter Ruth was born in 1919. In 1919 he embarked on Cruise VI. In 1920 the infant Ruth died suddenly from colitis. J. P. Ault nearly resigned to return home to be with his wife, but his colleagues persuaded him to complete Cruise VI. The Aults' third daughter Marjorie was born in 1923.

J. Harland Paul, a surgeon and observer aboard Cruise VII of the Carnegie'', wrote a book about the cruise.

Ault was elected in 1923 a fellow of the American Physical Society. He was a member of the American Association for the Advancement of Science, American Geographical Society, the American Geophysical Union, Chevy Chase Citizens Association, the Cosmos Club, and the National Geographic Society. His papers stored at the Carnegie Institution include an extensive correspondence between him and his wife. He is buried in Fort Lincoln Cemetery in Brentwood, Maryland.

Selected publications

Articles

Books

References

1881 births
1929 deaths
American geophysicists
American oceanographers
Baker University alumni
Columbia University alumni
Fellows of the American Physical Society
People from Olathe, Kansas